Giulio Trogli (1613–1685) was an Italian painter of the Baroque period.

Biography
He was initially a pupil of Francesco Gessi in Bologna. Giulio Trogli, devoting himself to quadratura, under Agostino Mitelli, and published a work entitled Paradossi della Prospettiva, and from then on, took the nickname of il Paradosso ("the Paradox").

References

1613 births
1685 deaths
17th-century Italian painters
Italian male painters
Painters from Bologna
Italian Baroque painters
Quadratura painters